Molecular Nutrition & Food Research is a peer-reviewed academic journal which focuses on molecular aspects of nutrition science. It was established in 1957 as Die Nahrung and obtained its current name in 2004. It was originally published by Akademie Verlag, but is now published by Wiley-Blackwell. The editor-in-chief is Hans-Ulrich Humpf (University of Münster).

Abstracting and indexing
The journal is abstracted and indexed in:
 Science Citation Index
 PubMed/MEDLINE
 Scopus
 Chemical Abstracts Service
 Current Contents/Agriculture, Biology & Environmental Sciences
 PASCAL

According to the Journal Citation Reports, the journal has a 2013 impact factor of 4.909, ranking it 3rd out of 123 journals in the category "Food Science & Technology".

References

External links

Nutrition and dietetics journals
Wiley-Blackwell academic journals
English-language journals
Publications established in 1957